Geysen or Geijsen is a Dutch patronymic surname meaning "Gijs' son". Notable people with the surname include:

Bettina Geysen (born 1969), Belgian politician
Frans Geysen (born 1936), Belgian composer and writer on music
Willy Geysen (born 1940s), Belgian engineer
Variants:
Carry Geijssen (born 1947), Dutch speed skater
Chris Gheysens (born 1971), American business executive

See also
Geysen Glacier, Antarctic glacier named after Hendrick Geysen
Gijsen, surname of the same origin
Oliver Geissen (born 1969), German television presenter

References

Dutch-language surnames
Patronymic surnames